Gromobój was a Polish improvised armoured train from the period of the Polish-Ukrainian war (1918-1919). The train took part in the fighting in the area of the rail junction in Zagórz. The train's armour was constructed from walls of brick, between which was river gravel. The locomotive used in the train was an ex-Austro-Hungarian kkStB Class 229.

See also 
List of armoured trains

Armoured trains of Poland